Renato Curi (20 September 1953 – 30 October 1977) was an Italian footballer who played as a midfielder. He is best known for his tenure as a Perugia mainstay in the 1970s until his death during a league game against Juventus.

Biography
Renato Curi was born in Montefiore dell'Aso, Province of Ascoli Piceno in 1953. He started his professional career in 1969 with then-amateur club Giulianova, helping his side to win promotion to Serie C. He left Giulianova in 1973 for Como, and Serie B club Perugia one year later, helping his side, coached by Ilario Castagner, to win a historical first promotion ever to Serie A, and being a grifoni mainstay in the next years. Notably, his impressive performances proved to be instrumental for ensuring Perugia a historical sixth place in their 1976–77 Serie A campaign, and newspapers started rumours about a possible call-up of him for the Italy national football team. However, this never happened, as Curi suddenly died on 30 October 1977 during a home match against Juventus, five minutes after the beginning of the second half, due to a myocardial infarction.

Legacy 
The Perugia home stadium where Curi died was later named after him. Also, a Serie D team is named Renato Curi Angolana.

References

Bibliography

See also
List of footballers who died while playing

1953 births
1977 deaths
Sportspeople from the Province of Ascoli Piceno
Italian footballers
Association football midfielders
Giulianova Calcio players
A.C. Perugia Calcio players
Serie A players
Association football players who died while playing
Sport deaths in Italy
Footballers from Marche